Displaced is a Kosovan short docufiction film, directed by Samir Karahoda and released in 2021. Blending both documentary and fictional elements, the film centres on Ermegan and Jeton, two men in Prizren who are attempting to maintain and rebuild the local table tennis club.

The film premiered at the 2021 Cannes Film Festival, in competition for the Short Film Palme d'Or. It was subsequently screened at the 2021 Toronto International Film Festival, where it won the award for Best International Short Film. In January 2022, it received the Best Non Fiction Short Film Award at the 2022 Sundance Film Festival.

The film was a nominee for Best Short Film at the 34th European Film Awards.

References

External links

2021 films
2021 short films
Kosovan drama films